The Gordian Knot is a 1911 silent film romantic comedy directed by R. F. Baker (*Richard Foster Baker) and produced by the Essanay Studios. It starred Francis X. Bushman and was distributed by the General Film Company.

Cast
Francis X. Bushman - Harry Robbins
Dorothy Phillips - Marion Walters

See also
Francis X. Bushman filmography

References

External links
The Gordion Knot at IMDb.com

1911 films
Essanay Studios films
American silent short films
1911 short films
American black-and-white films
1910s romantic comedy films
American romantic comedy films
1911 comedy films
1910s American films
Silent romantic comedy films
Silent American comedy films